Cuadrilla de Añana (in Basque Añanako Koadrila, Añanako Eskualdea or Añanako Taldea) is one of the seven cuadrillas (comarcas or regions) of the province of Álava. It covers an area of  693,2 km² with a population of 8,851 people (2014). The capital lies at Rivabellosa in the municipality of Ribera Baja but the most populated place is the village of Nanclares de la Oca in the municipality of Iruña de Oca.

Comarcas of Álava